Luoshan Dragon is a traditional dragon dance of the Lishui District and Fengzhen Luoshan Village, Nanjing,China.Luoshan Dragon is an intangible heritage, those is local one of the importance folk culture activity, has been 400 years history.

Performance
Luoshan Dragon Performance normally at 24th of the twelfth month of the lunar year crosses to 18 January of the next year, the performance is located near the beach of Shijiu Lake of the Luoshan Village. The Luoshan Dragon programme can be divided into Drafting, White Dragon Consecration and Dragon Dance, in three phases. The Dragon Dance starts at Drafting, dragon dancers are arranged in order in front of the longhuimen, led by three cannons and four red lanterns for the performance. The families of the village send for join the dragon dance at least one person. The dragon dance is not only by young adults but also by children between the ages of 8 and 12, totaling 500 people. Dragon dance consists of marbles, dragon dance and cloud dance. The marbles are various performances made by the ball-handling person to guide the dragon's head to swing forward. The dragon dancers need to be divided into two teams to perform alternately. The cloud dancers surround the dragon's body with multi-character cloth strips.

Crafting Workmanship
Crafting the Luoshan Dragon is done by binding dragon god skeletons, paper, painting, etc. Haucet 2.3 meters high, 2.2 meters wide, longxin 24 ethmoid bone, each ethmoid bone 2.8 meters long, body with nearly 100 meters in length. The dragon will be drafted until the 24th of the twelfth month of the lunar year. In addition, Crafting the dragon flags, colorful flags, big lanterns, horseshoe cannons still needs to be done. Second is crafting cloud plates and embroidery. Cloud plates total 66 pages, crafted by outlined with bamboo, made of wax paper with striations on it. Colorful embroidery is divided into headdress, dress, embroidery, etc.

References

Chinese dragons
Dance